Mukkadahalli is a village in Chamarajanagar district of Karnataka state, India.

Location
Mukkadahalli village is located on the highway from Chamarajanagar to Mysore. The nearest railway station is Konanur on Mysore–Chamarajanagar branch line.  Only two slow trains stop here.  The nearest major railway station is Mysore Junction.

Economy
Most of the people in the village are employed in the agrarian sector.  The village has a branch of Canara Bank.

Post office
There is a post office in Mukkadahalli and the postal code is 571128.

See also
 Konanur
 Konanur railway station
Badanavalu 
Narasam Budhi
Kavalande
Badana Guppe
Mariyala-Gangavadi Halt
 Badanaguppe

References

Villages in Chamarajanagar district